Haddenham railway station was a station in Haddenham, Cambridgeshire. It was first opened in 1866 by the Ely, Haddenham and Sutton Railway. It closed to passengers in 1931 through it continued to be served by occasional passenger excursion trains until 1958 and goods trains until full closure in 1964.

The station was one of the main goods yards on the line and featured a single platform, signal box, through goods shed and a number of sidings.

References

External links
 Haddenham station on navigable 1946 O. S. map

Former Great Eastern Railway stations
Disused railway stations in Cambridgeshire
Railway stations in Great Britain opened in 1866
Railway stations in Great Britain closed in 1931